The Nanjing Fiat Automobile Co., Ltd. was a car manufacturer located in the Jiangning District's Economic & Technological Development Zone in the city of Nanjing (People's Republic of China). The company was founded with an investment of 3 billion Yuan in April 1999 as a joint venture between Fiat Auto S.p.A. and the Nanjing Automobile Group. Around 30,000 up to 35,000 vehicles were manufactured annually for the Chinese market by Nanjing Fiat.

History 
The production began in November 2001 with the Fiat Palio. It was followed by the Fiat Siena in September 2002 and the Fiat Palio Weekend and Fiat Doblò in June 2003. The production of the Fiat Perla was launched in July 2006. The Perla was the last model launched by Nanjing Fiat. Another model, the Fiat Linea, was developed by Nanjing Fiat in cooperation with Tofaş A.Ş. and the Fiat do Brasil Ltda. The launch was scheduled for November 2006, but it never came because the Nanjing Automobile Group had forced to stop the car production until the end of the year, so the collaboration was officially terminated in order. In October 2006, Fiat had terminated their production in its Chinese facility. Nanjing Fiat was replaced by Roewe, the Chinese successor of the British Rover Group.

Most of Nanjing Fiat's tooling was acquired by Zotye in 2008. Zotye started building the Fiat Multipla as the Zotye Mutiplan in 2009 and an updated version of the Palio/Siena as the Zotye Z200 in 2011.

In July 2012, Fiat had founded a new Chinese joint venture. It's known as the GAC Fiat Automobiles Co., Ltd.

Products

References

External links 

 Fiat China (archived, 6 Jun 2017)

Vehicle manufacturing companies established in 1999
Car manufacturers of China
Fiat
Chinese companies established in 1999